Kelston is a New Zealand parliamentary electorate that returns one member to the House of Representatives.

Population centres
Kelston is located in an area in Auckland south-west of Waitematā Harbour covering part of Te Atatū South, the suburbs of Glen Eden, Sunnyvale, Glendene, Kelston, New Lynn, and Avondale, part of Mt Albert and the suburb of Waterview, with the name coming from one of its component suburbs.

History
Kelston was proposed in the 2013/14 electorate boundary review and confirmed by the Electoral Commission on 17 April 2014. The increase in population in the Auckland region as recorded in the 2013 census meant an extra electorate was required to keep all electorates within five percent of their quota.

The first three electorates are all safe Labour electorates while Waitakere was marginal; National's Paula Bennett won the electorate by just nine votes in 2011 from Labour's Carmel Sepuloni. Consequently, Kelston was regarded as a safe Labour electorate. Labour selected Sepuloni as its candidate for the 2014 general election, and she won the election with a majority of over 5,000 votes to National's Chris Penk.

Members of Parliament
Unless otherwise stated, all MPs' terms began and ended at general elections.

Key

As of  no candidates who have contested the Kelston electorate have been returned as list MPs.

Election results

2020 election

2017 election

2014 election

References

New Zealand electorates in the Auckland Region
2014 establishments in New Zealand
West Auckland, New Zealand